The Briançonnais zone or Briançonnais terrane is a piece of continental crust found in the Penninic nappes of the Alps.

According to some paleogeographic reconstructions the rocks of the Briançonnais zone were in fact a part of the microcontinent Iberia, that encompassed not only the Iberian Peninsula but also Corsica, Sardinia and the Balearic Islands. Because paleogeographic reconstructions of highly deformed pieces of crust are always difficult, this is disputed among geologists.

The Briançonnais zone is named after the French city of Briançon.

See also
Microcontinent Iberia

References

Geology of the Alps
Terranes
Geology of Switzerland
Geology of Austria